Semmalar Annam is an Indian actress who rose to fame with the critically acclaimed Tamil drama film Ammani (2016) directed by Lakshmy Ramakrishnan. She has also directed and acted in more than fifteen short films during her studies at college. Semmalar is well known for her street plays performed at Coimbatore for many social and environmental causes under her guide CR Jayaprakash, Eco Club of PSG College of Arts and Science.

Life
Semmalar Annam from Coimbatore is the eldest daughter of A.V.Karuppasamy and Boovathy and has an younger Brother Samaran.

Education
After her schooling at Krishnamal Higher Secondary School Coimbatore, she joined for Visual Communication studies at PSG College of Arts and Science and later did her post graduation in Mass Communication and Journalism from PSG College of Arts and Science, Coimbatore,. After her formal education, she underwent a course on acting and theater at the Stanislavsky Acting School, Chennai. which helped her to step into the Tamil film industry.

Career
During her post-graduate studies in journalism and mass communication at PSG College of Arts and Science, Coimbatore she performed several street-plays for environmental and social causes. Many of these street-plays were organized by her college professor CR Jayaprakash under the college Eco Club. These street plays were instrumental in bringing a lot of awareness and positive change to the society and reversing environmental damages caused to the 
.

Semmalar's debut film Malarmathi, about a sexually abused orphan won the best film and best director award at Legend 2010, a state-level short film festival organized by Department of Visual Communication, Sathyabama University, Chennai.

In the film Ammani, she plays the frustrated daughter-in-law of the main character: Salamma, a hard-working government hospital worker. Other than film, she has acted in several advertisements and documentaries.

Filmography
As an actress
All films are in Tamil, unless otherwise noted.

As Director

Awards
2012 Winner of a reality show at Kalaignar TV. The award was presented to the person who could prove his/her skills in several art forms like Dancing, Acting and Singing.

References

External links 

Living people
1990 births
People from Coimbatore
Indian film actresses